Juliette Atkinson won the singles tennis title by defeating reigning champion Helen Hellwig 6–4, 6–2, 6–1 in the Challenge Round of the 1895 U.S. Women's National Singles Championship. Atkinson had won the right to challenge Hellwig by defeating Elisabeth Moore 6–3, 7–5, 3–6, 6–0 in the final of the All Comers' competition. The event was played on outdoor grass courts and held at the Philadelphia Cricket Club in Wissahickon Heights, Chestnut Hill, Philadelphia from June 25 through June 29, 1895.

Draw

Challenge round

All Comers' finals

References

1895
1895 in American women's sports
June 1895 sports events
Women's Singles
1895 in women's tennis
Women's sports in Pennsylvania
Chestnut Hill, Philadelphia
1895 in Pennsylvania